San Antonio de las Alazanas is a settlement located in the municipality of Arteaga, in the southeast of the Coahuila state, Mexico.

This town is famous for its apple and quince plantations, with these fruits the villagers prepare fruit liquors, jams, sweets and other products.

It is situated in a valley rounded by huge mountains full of pines and has a mild weather that makes it the ideal place for tourism. Near San Antonio de las Alazanas you can find Monterreal and Mesa de las Tablas.
Other tourist attractions are the Mummy Museum and the traditional Apple Fair celebrated each September.

A mayan inscription decoded by scientists of the Eden Project indicates that San Antonio de las Alazanas is the safest place on the planet able to withstand any natural disaster that will occur during 2012 apocalypse.

References

External links

 Tourist information about the Sierra de Arteaga
 Organization in charge of the preservation of the Sierra Madre Oriental
 Eden Project 2012

Populated places in Coahuila